A. J. (Tony) Smith is a British fantasy author, known for his The Long War series of dark fantasy novels. His books are published by Head of Zeus, an independent publishing house set up in 2012 by established publisher Anthony Cheetham, and has been reviewed by SciFiNow.

Bibliography

The Long War series
The Black Guard (2013,)
The Dark Blood (2014,)
The Red Prince  (2015,)
The World Raven (2016,)

Form & Void
The Glass Breaks (2019,)
The Sword Falls (2021,)

References

 

Year of birth missing (living people)
Living people
Cthulhu Mythos writers
English fantasy writers
20th-century births